The 2013 Qatar Open (also known as 2013 Qatar ExxonMobil Open for sponsorship reasons) was a men's tennis tournament played on outdoor hard courts. It was the 21st edition of the Qatar Open, and part of the ATP World Tour 250 series of the 2013 ATP World Tour. It took place at the Khalifa International Tennis and Squash Complex in Doha, Qatar, from December 31, 2012, through January 5, 2013.

Singles main-draw entrants

Seeds

1 Rankings as of December 24, 2012.

Other entrants
The following players received wildcards into the singles main draw:
  Jabor Mohammed Ali Mutawa
  Mohamed Safwat
  Mousa Shanan Zayed

The following players received entry from the qualifying draw:
  Daniel Brands
  Dustin Brown
  Jan Hernych 
  Tobias Kamke

Withdrawals
Before the tournament
  Xavier Malisse
  Rafael Nadal

Doubles main-draw entrants

Seeds

1 Rankings as of December 24, 2012.

Other entrants
The following pairs received wildcards into the doubles main draw:
  Abdulrahman Harib /  Mousa Shanan Zayed
  Jabor Mohammed Ali Mutawa /  Mohamed Safwat

Finals

Singles

 Richard Gasquet defeated  Nikolay Davydenko, 3–6, 7–6(7–4), 6–3
 It was Gasquet's 1st singles title of the year and the 8th of his career.

Doubles

 Christopher Kas /  Philipp Kohlschreiber defeated  Julian Knowle /  Filip Polášek, 7–5, 6–4

References
General

Specific

External links
Official website